Sascha Bigalke (born 8 January 1990) is a German former professional footballer who played as an attacking midfielder.

Career
Bigalke started his professional career with Hertha BSC, making his first appearance on 31 July 2008 in the 2008–09 UEFA Cup first qualifying round second leg against FC Nistru Otaci. In January 2011, he was set to transfer to Arminia Bielefeld, but the deal fell through when Bigalke broke his foot shortly before the completion of the transfer. Having made only a single league appearance for Hertha, he moved on a free transfer to SpVgg Unterhaching in July 2011.

At Unterhaching Bigalke became a key player, scoring nine goals and providing twelve assists in 45 matches (league and cup). After playing in a 1-2 first round DFB-Pokal loss against 1. FC Köln he drew the opponent's attention and signed for them in August 2012, on transfer deadline day. The transfer fee allegedly amounted to €400,000 and helped chronically cash-strapped Unterhaching obtain a playing license.

In his first season for 1. FC Köln, Bigalke played a decent role with 16 appearances with eight of them in the starting eleven. During the 2013–14 pre-season he tore his cruciate ligament running into the opponent's goalkeeper in a friendly against local side SF Troisdorf. Subsequently, he missed almost the whole season, only being substituted once at second to last matchday in a home fixture against FC St. Pauli in which Bigalke scored.

On 22 July 2014, 1. FC Köln announced that Bigalke, along with four more players, would not be a part of the first team any more. Instead he was urged to leave the club and had to participate in training with the second team. Consequently, his contract was dissolved by mutual agreement and was able to return to Unterhaching on a free transfer. He signed for them on a one-year deal including an extension clause for another year.

Bigalke retired from football in March 2021 due to injuries.

Career statistics

References

External links
 
 
 

1990 births
Living people
Footballers from Berlin
German footballers
Germany youth international footballers
Association football midfielders
Füchse Berlin Reinickendorf players
Hertha BSC players
Hertha BSC II players
SpVgg Unterhaching players
1. FC Köln players
Bundesliga players
2. Bundesliga players
3. Liga players
Regionalliga players